Nigerian may refer to:
 Something of, from, or related to Nigeria, located in West Africa
 Nigerians, people from Nigeria
 Nigerian cuisine
 There is no language called "Nigerian".  For the most widely spoken languages in Nigeria, see Languages of Nigeria.

See also 
Culture of Nigeria
Demographics of Nigeria
List of Nigerians